The 1976 Southern Conference men's basketball tournament took place from February 28–March 4, 1976. The quarterfinal round was hosted at campus sites, while the semifinals and finals were hosted at the Greenville Memorial Auditorium in Greenville, South Carolina. The VMI Keydets, led by head coach Bill Blair, won their second Southern Conference title and received the automatic berth to the 1976 NCAA tournament.

Format
All of the conference's eight members were eligible for the tournament. Teams were seeded based on conference winning percentage. The tournament used a preset bracket consisting of three rounds.

Bracket

* Overtime game

See also
List of Southern Conference men's basketball champions

References

Tournament
Southern Conference men's basketball tournament
Southern Conference men's basketball tournament
Southern Conference men's basketball tournament
Southern Conference men's basketball tournament